Nambroca is a municipality located in the province of Toledo, Castile-La Mancha, Spain.

References

Municipalities in the Province of Toledo